Andreas Golombek (born 9 August 1968) is a German former professional footballer and manager who last managed Sportfreunde Lotte.

References

External links

1968 births
Living people
German footballers
Association football midfielders
Arminia Bielefeld players
SC Freiburg players
VfL Osnabrück players
SC Verl players
Fortuna Düsseldorf players
KFC Uerdingen 05 players
Rot Weiss Ahlen players
Grazer AK players
SG Wattenscheid 09 players
1. FC Magdeburg players
Borussia Neunkirchen players
German football managers
3. Liga managers
SC Verl managers
Sportfreunde Lotte managers
German expatriate footballers
German expatriate sportspeople in Austria
Expatriate footballers in Austria